This is a list of electoral results for the Electoral division of Fong Lim in Northern Territory elections.

Members for Fong Lim

Election results

Elections in the 2000s

Elections in the 2010s

Elections in the 2020s

References

Northern Territory electoral results by district